Michael Ashcroft (born December 7, 1964 in Leeds) is a Canadian sport shooter. He competed at the Summer Olympics in 1988 and 1992. In 1988, he placed eighth in the men's 50 metre rifle prone event, and in 1992, he tied for 15th place in the men's 50 metre rifle prone event.

References

1964 births
Living people
Sportspeople from Leeds
English emigrants to Canada
ISSF rifle shooters
Canadian male sport shooters
Shooters at the 1988 Summer Olympics
Shooters at the 1992 Summer Olympics
Olympic shooters of Canada
Shooters at the 1986 Commonwealth Games
Shooters at the 1990 Commonwealth Games
Commonwealth Games medallists in shooting
Commonwealth Games gold medallists for Canada
Commonwealth Games silver medallists for Canada
Pan American Games medalists in shooting
Pan American Games gold medalists for Canada
Shooters at the 1987 Pan American Games
Medallists at the 1986 Commonwealth Games
Medallists at the 1990 Commonwealth Games